Ika South is a Local Government Area of Delta State, Nigeria. It's headquarters is the town of Agbor.
 
Ika South is part of the greater Igbo speaking Anioma community of Delta State. It has an area of 436 km and a population of 162,594 at the 2006 census.
 
Ika South has notable sons and daughters who committed to community service thereby reducing the sufferings of their brethren. Among whom are Dr Jim Ovia from Obiolihe, Agbobi, Mr Agboje Egbonimali Shadrack from Ahima, Alisimie and Dr. Donald Peterson from Ogbisere. The postal code of the area is 321.

Cities, Towns and Communities
 Abavo
 Agbobi
 Agbor-Alidima
 Agbor Town
 Agbor, LGA headquarters
 Agbonta
 Aliagwa
 Alifekede
 Alizormo
 Alihagwu
 Alihame
 Aliokpu
 Alisimie
 Alisor
 Boji-Boji Agbor
 Emuhu
 Ewuru
 Oki
 Omumu
 Ekuku-Agbor
 Oza-Nogogo
 Idumuoza

Notable people
Jim Ovia Founder of Zenith Bank Nigeria PLC

References

https://www.ikaweekly.com/stop-promoting-igbo-culture-says-dein-of-agbor/#

Local Government Areas in Delta State